The National Gallery of Art Sculpture Garden is the most recent addition to the National Gallery of Art in Washington, D.C. in the United States.  It is located on the National Mall between the National Gallery's West Building and the Smithsonian Institution's National Museum of Natural History.

Completed and opened to the public on May 23, 1999, the location provides an outdoor setting for exhibiting several pieces from the museum's contemporary sculpture collection. The collection is centered on a fountain which, from December to March, is converted to an ice-skating rink.  (Such a rink predated the construction of the garden.)  The outdoor Pavilion Café lies adjacent to the garden.

Laurie Olin and his firm, OLIN, were the landscape architects who redesigned the garden.

Works

 Claes Oldenburg; Coosje van Bruggen, Typewriter Eraser, Scale X, 1999
 Joan Miró, Personnage Gothique, Oiseau-Eclair, 1974/1977
 Louise Bourgeois, Spider, 1996/1997
 Tony Smith, Wandering Rocks, 1967
 Magdalena Abakanowicz, Puellae, 1992
 Mark di Suvero, Aurora, 1992–93
 Scott Burton, Six-Part Seating, 1985/1998
 Joel Shapiro, Untitled, 1989
 Ellsworth Kelly, Stele II, 1973
 Barry Flanagan, Thinker on a Rock, 1997
 Sol LeWitt, Four-Sided Pyramid, 1965
 Lucas Samaras, Chair Transformation Number 20B, 1996
 Tony Smith, Moondog, 1964
 David Smith, Cubi XI, 1963
David Smith, Cubi XXVI, 1965
 Alexander Calder, Cheval Rouge, 1974
 Roy Lichtenstein, House I, 1996/1998
 George Rickey, Cluster of Four Cubes, 1992
 Hector Guimard, An Entrance to the Paris Métropolitain, 1902/1913
 Roxy Paine, Graft, 2008–2009
 Robert Indiana, AMOR, 1998/2006

References

External links

 
.S
Gardens in Washington, D.C.
Outdoor sculptures in Washington, D.C.
Sculpture gardens, trails and parks in the United States